American Buffalo may refer to:

American Buffalo (play), a play by David Mamet
American Buffalo (film), a 1996 film of Mamet's play directed by Michael Corrente
American Buffalo (coin), a US coin
American buffalo, a name for the American bison